A character sheet is a record of a player character in a role-playing game, including whatever details, notes, game statistics, and background information a player would need during a play session.  Character sheets can be found in use in both traditional and action role-playing games. Almost all role-playing games make use of character sheets in some fashion; even "rules-light" systems and freeform role-playing games record character details in some manner.

The role-playing video game equivalent is known as a status screen. Some non-role-playing games, such as some board games and party games, also use records that could be compared to character sheets.

History 
The first role-playing game published, Dungeons & Dragons (1974), did not include a character sheet. The first one ever published was in the Haven Herald fanzine of Stephen Tihor published on May 3, 1975. One month after, another character sheet was released in the APA magazine Alarums and Excursions.

Since then, most tabletop role-playing games use a character sheet for information about the player characters. Most of them fit onto one page, but some games like Castle Falkenstein or Sailor Moon RPG use a full booklet. Other games such as Ars Magica (covenant sheet) or Warhammer Fantasy Roleplay III (party sheet) and Reign use a sheet for a group of player characters.

Overview
What is considered relevant can vary by game and personal preference—one player may consider his character's eye colour or personal background relevant while another might not, but both may be required by the game rules to note down on their sheet if their character suffers an injury.

Character sheets for a game are usually found within the game's main rulebook, and permission is almost always given for players to photocopy this sheet. Some publishers sell preprinted sheets separately. Many offer PDF files with character sheets for the players to print out themselves. It is not uncommon for players to create custom character sheets, to their own design, rather than use the publisher's “official” offerings.

A player may have an additional character sheet if he also controls a second character, a cohort or a hireling, but this is less common. The dungeon master, who runs the game, may optionally keep proper character sheets for non-player characters (NPCs) if he wishes to keep full information on the character. Some rulebooks offer special “NPC sheets” for this purpose that are considerably smaller than the usual (main) character sheets.

Design

General characteristics
A character sheet is likely to include stable attributes, such as the character's name and physical characteristics. It may also include values that change often such as experience, abilities, health/vitality (e.g. hit points) and an inventory of items possessed. It is common for a character sheet to essentially be a record of a character's history as changes are made and important things noted. It is referenced during gameplay. Despite the name, a single character "sheet" may actually be two or more pages in length.

The content and design of such a sheet will vary greatly depending on what game it is used for and will reflect its play style and rules system. For instance, the Dungeons & Dragons game deals with combat, skill use and gaining abilities. The sheet devotes a section to a character's name and description, a section to combat statistics, then areas for detailing statistics of what weapons and offenses the character has, while another section details the character's skills. On the other hand, Tri-Stat dX is a simpler system placing a greater emphasis on special abilities, so its standard character sheet devotes a large area to recording the character's special abilities.

The layout of a character sheet, when creating a character sheet or choosing which one to use, is important. First, the sheet must be sure to allow the player to record everything relevant to their character. Secondly, it must also allow them to easily find and read off any information at a glance whenever they need it. In addition, if the character sheet is more than one page long, careful consideration must be given to put the most often used data areas at the front page. In all cases, care must be given to ensuring that the layout is generally well organized, grouping similar areas together logically while being easily readable and not overcrowded.

Paper character sheets
Many game rules come with a standard character sheet: a fill-in form which may be photocopied and has sections laid out for all of the game statistics a character can have. Some players design their own character sheets or record their character information on a sheet of paper, although inexperienced players are recommended to use properly formatted sheets to avoid leaving out important information.

Electronic character sheets
With the advent of personal computing, players began designing character sheets with computers. The earliest computer-generated character sheets were designed in a word processing program, so that players could fill in their information and have a typewritten sheet to use. Next, players began to experiment with spreadsheet solutions, so that some of the calculations required were automated. Some important advantages of spreadsheet character sheets are ease of access, automatic calculations, complex formulas can be more easily coded and they remove reliance on pen and paper. Wizards of the Coast included a character generator CD with their Player's Handbook, 3rd Edition, and offered the Character Builder for download to D&D Insider subscribers, alongside a Monster Builder as part of Dungeons and Dragons Adventure Tools.

Dynamic character sheets
A Dynamic Character Sheet is an electronic sheet that is used in conjunction with a computer/mobile device during gaming sessions. Such a character sheet is used not only to track the character, but to also add/apply effects to the character on the fly. For example, if the character receives the effects of a spell which increases its strength score, then a dynamic character sheet will be able to automatically update all the effects of a higher strength character. Another example is if a character activates one of his abilities, the dynamic character sheet will be able to apply the effects of that ability in real time. Furthermore, such character sheets enable the player to track the duration of the applied effect, thus turning off effects that have expired.

References

External links
 RPGSheets.com
 Mad Irishman Productions, featuring character sheets
 D20Sheets.com Resource for character sheets for the d20 System and many other different game systems
 CharacterSheet.net, Managing and creating character sheets online
 , The Dungeons & Dragons official website's character sheet downloads

 
Role-playing game terminology